The Denver Pioneers football team formerly represented the University of Denver in college football.

History
Football was once the most popular sport at the university; the first DU football game was played in 1885 against Colorado College, which is believed to be the first intercollegiate football game played west of the Mississippi River.

Coach John P. Koehler led the team to its first conference titles in 1908 and 1909, and the 1917 team won its league title and went undefeated at 9–0. DU also won the 1933 RMAC co-championship. DU's later football highlights include appearances in the 1946 Sun Bowl, 1947 Alamo Bowl, and 1951 Pineapple Bowl, but without wins. From 1938 to 1960, DU was a member of the Mountain States/Skyline Conference, winning titles in 1945, 1946 and its sixth and final conference title in 1954, which was DU's only national top-20 team, peaking at number 18. The football team played in a 30,000-seat stadium that stood on campus from 1926 to 1971.

The final season for DU football was in 1960; the program was discontinued in January 1961 for financial reasons.

Denver sent 12 players to the NFL or All-America Football Conference - with three of them becoming famous: John Woudenberg, a 1942 pro-bowl player for the San Francisco 49ers,  Sam Etcheverry, a CFL Hall-of-Famer as player and coach who also played for the St. Louis Cardinals of the NFL, and Don Stansauk, a former Green Bay Packers player who became famous as Hard-Boiled Haggerty, a pro-wrestler.

Conference championships

† Co-champions

Bowl games
Denver participated in three bowl games, losing all three.

References

External links
College Football Data Warehouse  - Denver Pioneers

 
American football teams established in 1885
American football teams disestablished in 1960
1885 establishments in Colorado
1960 disestablishments in Colorado